Karinj is a village in the Lori Province of Armenia.  It belongs to the municipality of Tumanyan.

Development Programs 
In 2015 some programs started to be implemented in Karinj by Children of Armenia Fund.

Girls of Armenia Leadership Soccer (GOALS), Student Councils, English Language Instruction, Social and Psychological Assistance, Health and Lifestyle Education, School Nutrition & Brushodromes, Women Health Screenings, Support for Reproductive Health were implemented in the village by COAF.

COAF SMART, cafeteria and brushodrome were renovated in the village school.

Gallery

See also 

 Lori province
 Children of Armenia Fund

References 

Populated places in Lori Province